Post-translational regulation refers to the control of the levels of active protein.

There are several forms.

It is performed either by means of reversible events (posttranslational modifications, such as phosphorylation or sequestration) or by means of irreversible events (proteolysis).

See also
 Post-translational modification

References

Gene expression
Post-translational modification